Rancho Santa Fe Elementary School District is a public school district in San Diego County, California, United States. It consists of only one site, R. Roger Rowe School, which comprises a public elementary school (K–5) and a public middle school (6–8).

References

External links
 

School districts in San Diego County, California